Ranko Veselinović (born 24 March 1999) is a Serbian professional footballer who plays for Major League Soccer club Vancouver Whitecaps.

Club career

Vojvodina
Born in Novi Sad, Veselinović came through the Vojvodina youth academy, as a captain of the generation. In summer 2016, Veselinović signed a three-year scholarship contract. He joined the first team during the 2016–17 Serbian SuperLiga campaign at the age of 17 but missed to make any official appearance until the end of season. At the beginning of new season, Veselinović converted his squad number taking 33 jersey and continued playing with youth team respective. He made his senior debut as a centre-back in 3–1 victory over Napredak Kruševac on 16 September 2017. On 27 October 2017, Ranko signed his first professional contract, penning a deal that would keep him in Vojvodina until June 2021.

Vancouver Whitecaps
On 9 February 2020, it was announced that Vancouver Whitecaps of Major League Soccer had acquired Veselinović on a season-long loan, with an option to purchase, which they exercised on 18 October 2020.

International career
Veselinović appeared as a member of Serbia national under-16 football team between 2014 and 2015, scoring a goal in 3–1 away victory over Russia on 23 August 2014. Later he also played for Serbian under-17 and under-18 selection until 2017. In August 2017, Veselinović was called into the Serbia U19 squad, when he made a debut at the memorial tournament "Stevan Vilotić - Ćele". In December 2017, Veselinović got his first call in Serbian under-21 team by coach Goran Đorović, instead of injured Srđan Babić. He made his debut for the team in away friendly against Qatar on 17 December 2017.

Honours

Club 
Vancouver Whitecaps
 Canadian Championship: 2022

Career statistics

Club

International

References

External links
 
 
 

1999 births
Living people
Footballers from Novi Sad
Association football defenders
Serbian footballers
Serbia youth international footballers
FK Vojvodina players
Vancouver Whitecaps FC players
Serbian SuperLiga players
Serbia under-21 international footballers
Major League Soccer players
Serbian expatriate footballers
Serbian expatriate sportspeople in Canada
Serbia international footballers